Rodrigo Moreno Munar (born April 29, 1966 in Bogotá, Distrito Capital) is a retired male race walker from Colombia.

Personal bests

Achievements

References

sports-reference

1966 births
Living people
Colombian male racewalkers
Athletes (track and field) at the 2008 Summer Olympics
Olympic athletes of Colombia
Sportspeople from Bogotá
Central American and Caribbean Games silver medalists for Colombia
Competitors at the 2010 Central American and Caribbean Games
Central American and Caribbean Games medalists in athletics
21st-century Colombian people